In heraldry, the Allocamelus (a.k.a. Ass-Camel) was the depiction of a mythical creature with the head of a donkey and the body of a camel. It was first used as a crest for the English Eastland Company, and later by the Russia Company.

External links
 "Allocamelus (archived)". The Probert Encyclopedia of Heraldry. URL accessed 2007-02-26.

Mythological hybrids
Heraldic beasts
Legendary mammals